Turtle River is a town in Beltrami County, Minnesota, United States. The population was 77 at the 2010 census. The elevation is 1,332 ft (406m). It is approximately 17 miles northeast of Bemidji, where most community services are available. Turtle River consists of two stores, a restaurant, a gas station, and a church.

Geography

Politics
The mayor of Turtle River was Gary Burger (of rock band The Monks) until his death in 2014.

Demographics

2010 census
As of the census of 2010, there were 77 people, 37 households, and 24 families living in the city. The racial makeup of the city was 98.7% White and 1.3% Native American.

There were 37 households, of which 18.9% had children under the age of 18 living with them, 54.1% were married couples living together, 8.1% had a female householder with no husband present, 2.7% had a male householder with no wife present, and 35.1% were non-families. 29.7% of all households were made up of individuals. The average household size was 2.08 and the average family size was 2.50.

The median age in the city was 50.8 years. 15.6% of residents were under the age of 18; 5.2% were between the ages of 18 and 24; 19.5% were from 25 to 44; 50.7% were from 45 to 64; and 9.1% were 65 years of age or older. The gender makeup of the city was 49.4% male and 50.6% female.

2000 census
As of the census of 2000, there were 75 people, 34 households, and 19 families living in the city. The racial makeup of the city was 100.00% White.

There were 34 households, of which 29.4% had children under the age of 18 living with them, 52.9% were married couples living together, 5.9% had a female householder with no husband present, and 41.2% were non-families. 26.5% of all households were made up of individuals, and 5.9% had someone living alone who was 65 years of age or older. The average household size was 2.21 and the average family size was 2.70.

In the city, the population was spread out, with 22.7% under the age of 18, 4.0% from 18 to 24, 34.7% from 25 to 44, 28.0% from 45 to 64, and 10.7% who were 65 years of age or older. The median age was 38 years. For every 100 females, there were 92.3 males. For every 100 females age 18 and over, there were 100.0 males.

The median income for a household in the city was $38,333, and the median income for a family was $68,750. Males had a median income of $18,750 versus $14,750 for females. The per capita income for the city was $22,102. There were no families and 3.3% of the population living below the poverty line, including no under eighteens and none of those over 64.

References

Cities in Beltrami County, Minnesota
Cities in Minnesota